Reynolds Michael Tee Tan (born November 18, 1988) is a Filipino politician from the province of Samar. He currently serves as Philippine House of Representatives member for the 2nd District of Samar since 2022. He formerly served as Governor of Samar and Vice Governor.

Political career
In 2019, Tan ran and won as Vice Governor of Samar beating former Vice Governor Jesus Redaja. He succeeded the post from his brother Stephen James Tan who held the position for three terms.

In November 30, 2019, Tan succeeded the position of Governor after the untimely demise of his mother, Governor Milagrosa Tan.

In 2022, Tan although still eligible to run for Governor did not file for re-election but instead ran for Congressman of the 2nd District of Samar, switching places with his sister Sharee Ann Tan. Both Reynolds Michael and Sharee Ann won the elections.

Tan Political Clan
Reynolds Michael is a member of the ruling Tan political clan of Samar.

His sister Sharee Ann Tan is the incumbent Governor. She served the same position from 2010 to 2019. Sharee Ann was Samar's 2nd District Congresswoman from 2007 to 2010 and from 2019 to 2022.

His older brother Stephen James Tan is the incumbent Congressman of Samar's 1st District and was the Vice Governor from 2010 until 2019.

His mother Milagrosa Tan served as Sangguniang Panlalawigan Member for Samar's 2nd District from 1998 to 2001, Governor from 2001 to 2010, Samar's 2nd District Congresswoman from 2010 to 2019 and again Governor from 2019 until her death.

His uncle, Arnold V. Tan is the incumbent Vice Governor.

His other uncle Ruben V. Tan was a Sangguniang Panlalawigan Member for Samar's 2nd District from 1995 to 1998. He was a replacement candidate for Reynolds Michael's father Ricardo Tan who died before the election.

Governorship
In 2021, a known anti-mining advocate, Tan proposed for the redesign of the provincial seal of Samar to remove the logging and mining symbols and replace with a Philippine eagle.

He is known to be an advocate for rural development evidenced by various road connectivity to barangays and sitio projects he undertook while serving as governor.

One of the big ticket project he undertook before stepping down as governor was the Samar Business District Reclamation Project in Samar's capital, Catbalogan.

During his term as governor Samar's poverty incidence was reduced significantly as well as its malnutrition among children.

Personal life
He is a husband to Ma. Rocca Socorro Tizon and father to River Markus Tan.

He is the youngest child of Ricardo Tan and Milagrosa Tan, and brother to Angelie, Sharee Ann Tan and Stephen James Tan.

References

Living people
Governors of Samar (province)
Politicians from Samar (province)
PDP–Laban politicians
Nacionalista Party politicians
1988 births